Ang Dalubhasa is a 2000 Filipino action film starring Fernando Poe Jr., who directed the film under the moniker Ronwaldo Reyes, Nanette Medved and Maritoni Fernandez. The film was a vehicle for Medved's comeback after graduating summa cum laude in Babson College for business studies, and is also the first blockbuster in Philippine cinema for the year 2000. This comes after his 1999 film, Isusumbong Kita sa Tatay Ko..., which was that year's highest grossing Philippine film.

This was also pop star Cris Villonco's film debut. Villonco later stated that she thought Fernando Poe, Jr. discovered her via the Pop Cola commercial.

Plot
Jimmy de Guzman is a military doctor and is the lone survivor of a massacre during his wife's boss' farewell dinner. He spends years hunting down the criminals until he was able to kill the last of them and avenging his wife, her boss and his daughter. Returning to his normal life, he became a respected military neurosurgeon, and engaged to the daughter of one of the hospital tycoons in Cebu. When his fiancee's niece succumbed to aneurism, Jimmy was the lead surgeon, but the girl dies while recuperating, thus placing the blame on Jimmy's shoulders. Shamed, he escapes to Manila where he spends his days drinking to drown his sorrow.

In his new home, Jimmy enjoys being incognito. After overcoming alcoholism, he becomes respected by the community, and his legend grows further when he conducted appendectomy on son of a police officer during a flood. It was then revealed that a co-doctor, jealous of his success, deliberately overdosed his former fiancee's niece. This comes about after the doctor confessed to his wife and every one in the party that he poisoned the girl, causing his wife to disown him and have him arrested for it.

Jimmy later discovers that he has not fully avenged his family as the leader of the criminals that killed his wife is still on the loose with a new band of men. After a firefight aboard a docked ship, Jimmy finally kills the leader ending his 8 years, 4 months and 3 days arduous journey.

He is coaxed to go back to Cebu but he choose to remain with new friends and newfound love.

Cast

Main Cast 

Fernando Poe, Jr. as Maj. Jaime "Jimmy" de Guzman, M.D.
Nanette Medved as Connie
Maritoni Fernandez as Menchu

Supporting Cast 

Cris Villonco as Sheila
Paquito Diaz as Sarge
Ricardo Cepeda as Dr. Willy Romero
Berting Labra as Pekto
Bob Soler as Ship's Captain
Romy Diaz as Adyong Tulak
Zandro Zamora as Elmer
Johnny Vicar as Leonardo Salazar
Marco Polo Garcia as Julius
Dindo Arroyo as Paeng
Manjo del Mundo as Manjo
Nonoy de Guzman as Noy
Gerald Ejercito as Gerry
R.G. Gutierrez as R.G.
Bong Francisco as Bong
Tony Carreon as Menchu's father
Marita Zobel as Menchu's mother
Maita Sanchez as Delia de Guzman
Cecille Buensuseco as Catherine de Guzman
Bon Vibar as Judge Dimayuga
Dedes Whitaker as Lorena
Dante Castro as Dr. Policarpio
Jesette Rospero as Mrs. Dimayuga
Naty Santiago as Sheila's Yaya
Nanding Fernandez as Retired doctor
Mark Angelo Wilson as Lito
Bert Olivar
Vic Varrion
Eddie Tuazon

References

External links

2000 films
2000 action films
Films directed by Fernando Poe Jr.
Films set in 1989
Films set in 1991
Films set in Manila
Films with screenplays by Pablo S. Gomez
Philippine action films
2000s Tagalog-language films
Maverick Films films